Black Wolf Township is a township in Ellsworth County, Kansas, USA.  As of the 2000 census, its population was 87.

Geography

The streams of Buffalo Creek, Little Wolf Creek, Loss Creek, Turkey Creek and Wolf Creek run through this township.

References
 USGS Geographic Names Information System (GNIS)

External links
 US-Counties.com
 City-Data.com

Townships in Ellsworth County, Kansas
Townships in Kansas